Sur was a literary magazine published in Buenos Aires between 1931 and 1992.

History and profile
Sur was first published in 1931, with the assistance of a multidisciplinary team of collaborators. Its founder and main backer was Victoria Ocampo, and it was supported intellectually by the Spanish philosopher José Ortega y Gasset.  Many of the earliest editions of Sur carry the colophon of Ortega's Revista de Occidente.  Notable contributors and sometime editors included Jorge Luis Borges, H.A. Murena, Adolfo Bioy Casares and Borges' Spanish brother-in-law Guillermo de Torre. The last issue was published in 1992.

References

External links

Complete archive of Sur publications, from Gale Digital Collections
Digitalization of Sur publications, from Biblioteca National

1931 establishments in Argentina
1992 disestablishments in Argentina
Defunct literary magazines
Defunct magazines published in Argentina
Jorge Luis Borges
Literary magazines published in Argentina
Magazines established in 1931
Magazines established in 1992
Magazines published in Buenos Aires
Spanish-language magazines